The Corinthia Football Clubs Association (Enossi Podosferikon Somation Nomou Korinthias) is a football (soccer) organization in Corinthia that is part of the Greek Football Federation.

Foundation

Corinthia FCA was formed in 1946 besides the first council by Michail Fillipidis and Kon. Tsouloufas and its expansion of other products of local soccer. Its founding bodies was seven and ten outside the competition:

Aris Corinth
Achilleas (Achillefs) Corinth
Iraklis Lechaio
Iraklis Xylokastro
Olympiakos Corinth
Olympiacos Loutraki
Pelopas (Pelofs) Kiato
Stratiotiko Kentro Vasikis Ekpedefsis Korinthou (KVEK): took part in the championships without any points.

Its important success in the union in the early 1950s was the local championship organization and its cooperation with Pagkorinthiakos in the first championship of the Premier Division in the 1959-60 season.

Today

Corinthia FCA is headquartered in Corinth and its strength includes about 70 clubs. Basic organizations of the association is local soccer championship in three divisions and the Corinthia Cup which features teams from local categories. The body-member of the association which participates in the fourth division and its amateur teams from the association which has a chance to play in the highest categories, the Super League, the second and the third divisions.

The winner of all of Korinthia receives an entry into the national Fourth Division.

The winner of the Korinthia Cup receives an entry to the Greek Amateur Cup.

The association organizes children's and youth championships, it also supervises the women's clubs and rarely competes in the Corinthia FCA Mixed which features games from other mixed associations.

The association awards each year a reward to the greatest scorer and the Character Cup to teams with the highest points "fair play" of each category

Divisions (2009-10)

The 2009-10 season features the following teams:

Premier Division

Second Division

Third Division

Teams in higher divisions

In the 2009-10 season, the following clubs from Corinthia took part in higher divisions:

Third Division:
PAS Corinth
Fourth Division:
Atromitos Chiliomodo
Olympiacos Loutraki
Pelopas Kiato
Iraklis Xylokastro

References
This article incorporates text from the Equivalent article in the Greek Wikipedia.

External links
http://www.epskor.gr 

Sport in Corinthia
Association football governing bodies in Greece